Calosima albapenella is a moth in the family Blastobasidae. It is found in the United States, including Texas and Florida.

The wingspan is about 19 mm or less. The forewings are white, suffused and sprinkled with brownish fuscous intermixed with pale fawn brown. The hindwings are shining pale-brownish gray.

The larvae have been found in dry oranges infested by the beetle Arseocerus fasciculatus.

References

Moths described in 1875
albapenella